Retroglide is the eleventh and most recent studio album by the British rock/pop/fusion group Level 42. It was released 12 years after their previous album and reached the UK Top 80. It is a mix of electronica with Level 42's traditional blend of funk and pop. The album is notable for featuring songs written by Boon Gould, the band's original guitarist (whose guitar is featured on "Ship") and bassist/vocalist Mark King.

The album cover was designed by Alan Brooks who previously created the sleeves for the 1983 singles of "The Chinese Way" and "Out of Sight, Out of Mind". The sleeve depicts a futuristic updated version of the band's Princess logo, who was first pictured on Level 42's self-titled debut album in 1981, which although not credited was inspired by the figure of Maria of the 1927 film, Metropolis.

Track listing

Digital downloads
"The Way Back Home" (radio edit)

Personnel
Mark King – bass guitar, percussion, guitars, vocals
Mike Lindup – EVP88 keyboards, vocals
Nathan King – guitars, vocals
Gary Husband – drums
Sean Freeman – saxes
Lyndon Connah – keyboards
Boon Gould – guitar solo on "Ship"

References

External links
Level 42 Retroglide
Retroglide on UltimateLevel42

Level 42 albums
2006 albums